Japan Breeding farms' Cup Ladies' Classic (ジャパンブリーディングファームズカップレディスクラシック) is an annual race that is usually held on November 3, the national holiday Culture Day. This race was started as third JBC race in 2011. The first race was held at the Oi racetrack, and was won by Miracle Legend. In 2015, this was the only Grade 1 dirt race (including domestic Grade 1 race) for fillies and mares.

The a Ladies' Prelude (domestic grade2, Jpn2 race), founded in 2011, is held as trial race.

Winners

Open middle distance horse races
Horse races in Japan
Recurring sporting events established in 2011
2011 establishments in Japan
Dirt races in Japan